Dwayne Whitfield (born August 22, 1972 in Aberdeen, Mississippi) is an American former professional basketball player. A 6'9" and 240 lb power forward, he played college basketball at Jackson State University and had a brief stint in the NBA with the Toronto Raptors.

Whitfield was selected 40th overall by the Golden State Warriors in the 1995 NBA draft. He played 8 games in the inaugural season for the Toronto Raptors in early 1996 after he was acquired in a multi-player trade for B. J. Armstrong. He also played professionally abroad in Italy, Spain, China, Hungary, Mexico, Venezuela and Chile. He also played with the Rockford Lightning of the CBA, The Brooklyn Kings of the USBL and The NBA Ambassadors under head coach Nate "Tiny" Archibald.

Notes

External links
NBA stats @ basketballreference.com

1972 births
Living people
African-American basketball players
American expatriate basketball people in Canada
American men's basketball players
Basketball players from Mississippi
Golden State Warriors draft picks
Jackson State Tigers basketball players
People from Aberdeen, Mississippi
Power forwards (basketball)
Toronto Raptors players
21st-century African-American sportspeople
20th-century African-American sportspeople